Digorsky (masculine), Digorskaya (feminine), or Digorskoye (neuter) may refer to:
Digorsky District, a district of the Republic of North Ossetia–Alania, Russia
Digorskoye Urban Settlement, a municipal formation which Digora Town Under District Jurisdiction in Digorsky District of the Republic of North Ossetia–Alania, Russia is incorporated as
Alan Digorsky, presumably the real name of Emir Saad, Ossetian Islamist militant